Dickon is an English masculine given name.

The name "Dickon" is derived from the old English name for Richard. Unlike Richard, Dickon is rarely shortened to Dick or Dickie, as it is already commonly considered a short form of the same name.

The first recorded literary reference to the name is of a painting of King Richard III entitled Dickon of York. Marjorie Bowen used that nickname to title her historical novel Dickon (1929).

People by the name Dickon
 Dickon Edwards (born 1971), London-based indie pop musician, writer, critic, DJ and online diarist
 Dickon Tolson (born 1973), British actor
 Dickon Hinchliffe, British composer and former member of Tindersticks

Fictional characters
 Bart Dickon, a British comic strip character frequently appearing in the magazine The Chap in the late 1990s
 Dickon Sowerby, one of the main characters in the novel The Secret Garden (1910) by Frances Hodgson Burnett
 Dickon, an invisible servant to witch Mother Rigby in Feathertop (1852) by Nathaniel Hawthorne
 Dickon, the Devil himself, in the play The Scarecrow (1908) by Percy MacKaye based on Feathertop
 Dickon Tarly, a character in A Song of Ice and Fire by George R. R. Martin and its TV adaptation
 Dickon Broom, a character in This is What Happened (2018) by Mick Herron

English masculine given names